Gaurav Pandey is an Indian actor. He trained at Kreating Characters Acting School. He has appeared in ads for brands including Colgate Plax, OLX, KFC, Sprite and Volkswagen. His first film appearance was in the supporting role of Shaunty in Humpty Sharma Ki Dulhania (2014). He has also starred in a Siddharth Sikka short film 'The Love Bites'. In 2015, Pandey appeared in the Y Films web series A Man's World. He also appeared in the 2016 Remo D'Souza film A Flying Jatt.
School:Selaqui international school, Dehradun

Filmography

films

Web series

References 

Living people
Male actors in Hindi cinema
Male actors from Delhi
Male actors in Bengali cinema
21st-century Indian male actors
Year of birth missing (living people)